Marc Fumaroli (10 June 1932 – 24 June 2020) was a French historian and essayist who was widely respected as an advocate for French literature and culture. While born in Marseille, Fumaroli grew up in the Moroccan city of Fez, and served in the French army during the Algerian War.

Career 
Following his appointment to a chair in Seventeenth Century Studies at Paris-Sorbonne University (1980), he was elected to a Chair in Rhetoric and Society in Europe (16th and 17th century) at the Collège de France. He held it from 1986 to 2002, until mandatory retirement, and was an emeritus professor. He is acknowledged for the revival of Rhetoric as field of study of European culture, in a sharp move away from both structuralism and post-modernism. His pioneering work remains L'Âge de l'éloquence (1980). In 1994, as a Voltaire scholar, he gave (in French) the British Academy's Master-Mind Lecture.

Awards 
Fumaroli was elected to the Académie Française on 2 March 1995 and became its director. He was also a member of the Académie des Inscriptions, the sister academy devoted to high erudition.

In 2000, Fumaroli delivered the annual A. W. Mellon Lectures in the Fine Arts. A year later, he received the prestigious Balzan Prize for literary history and criticism.

Fumaroli was a foreign member of the British Academy and of the American Philosophical Society. He was also a member of the University of Chicago's Committee on Social Thought.

Fumaroli was promoted to commander of the French Legion of Honor in 2008, after previously being named chevalier in 1993 and officer in 2002.

After his death, the office of French President Emmanuel Macron praised Fumaroli as one of the country's greatest ever storytellers and historians.

Bibliography
 1980  L’Âge de l’éloquence : rhétorique et « res literaria » de la Renaissance au seuil de l’époque classique (Droz) 
 1985  Présentation et commentaire de La Fontaine, Fables, Lettres françaises (Imprimerie nationale) 
 1989  Catalogue de l’exposition. L’inspiration du poète de Poussin. Essai sur l’allégorie du Parnasse (Musée du Louvre) 
 1990  Héros et orateurs, Rhétorique et dramaturgie cornéliennes (Droz); 
 1990  « La période 1600-1630 », in Précis de littérature française du XVIIe siècle, edited by Jean Mesnard (PUF) 
 1991  L’État culturel, essai sur une religion moderne (Le Fallois) 
 1994  L’École du silence (Flammarion) 
 1994  Trois institutions littéraires (Gallimard) 
 1994  La Diplomatie de l’esprit, de Montaigne à La Fontaine (Hermann) 
 1996  Le Loisir lettré à l’âge classique  (Droz) (edited by Marc Fumaroli, Emmanuel Bury and Philippe-Joseph Salazar)
 1997  Le Poète et le Roi. Jean de La Fontaine en son siècle (Le Fallois) 
 1998  L'Art de la conversation, edited by Marc Fumaroli, Anthologie de Jacqueline Hellegouarc'h (Garnier) 
 1999  Histoire de la rhétorique dans l'Europe moderne (edited and prefaced by Marc Fumaroli) (PUF) 
 1999  Chateaubriand et les Arts, « Ut Pictura Poesis : Chateaubriand et les Arts », recueil d'études, publié avec le soutien de la Fondation Singer-Polignac (Le Fallois) 
 2000  L'Esprit de la société, Cercle et « salons » parisiens au XVIIIe siècle, edited by Marc Fumaroli, Anthologie de Jacqueline Hellegouarc'h (Garnier) 
 2000  La Querelle des Anciens et des Modernes, précédé d'un essai "Les Abeilles et les Araignées" (Gallimard) 
 2001  L'Art de persuader, de Pascal, précédé par L'Art de conférer, de Montaigne (preface by Marc Fumaroli) (Rivages) 
 2001  Quand l'Europe parlait français (Le Fallois) 
 2001  La Diplomatie de l'esprit (Gallimard) 
 2001  Poussin, Sainte Françoise Romaine   
 2002  Richelieu : l'Art et le pouvoir, edited by Hilliard Todd Goldfarb (Musée des Beaux-Arts de Montréal) 
 2004  Chateaubriand. Poésie et Terreur (Le Fallois) 
 2006  Exercices de lecture de Rabelais à Paul Valéry (Gallimard) 
 2009  Paris-New York et retour : Voyage dans les arts et les images (Fayard)
 2014  Le Sablier Renversé: Des Modernes aux Anciens (Gallimard)
 2015  La République des Lettres (Gallimard)
 2021 Dans ma bibliothèque: La guerre et la paix (Les Belles Lettres/de Fallois)

In English
 2011 : When the World Spoke French (Quand l'Europe parlait français), translated by Richard Howard (New York: New York Review of Books)
2018 : The Republic of Letters (La République des Lettres), translated by Lara Vergnaud (New Haven: Yale University Press)

References

External links
  L'Académie française
  Radio interview by Maxence Caron with Marc Fumaroli of the Académie française
  Marc Fumaroli  International Balzan Prize Foundation

1932 births
2020 deaths
Writers from Marseille
French people of Corsican descent
Academic staff of the Collège de France
Members of the Académie des Inscriptions et Belles-Lettres
Members of the Académie Française
Members of the American Philosophical Society
Commandeurs of the Ordre des Arts et des Lettres
Commandeurs of the Ordre des Palmes Académiques
Grand Officiers of the Légion d'honneur
Grand Officers of the Ordre national du Mérite
Grand Officers of the Order of Merit of the Italian Republic
Corresponding Fellows of the British Academy